Padmanabhapuram is an assembly constituency located in Kanniyakumari Lok Sabha Constituency in Kanyakumari district in Tamil Nadu. It is one of the 234 State Legislative Assembly Constituencies in Tamil Nadu, in India.

Nadar is the biggest community in this constituency with around 60% population.

The population of other communities is Meenavar 10%, Muslims 9% and Paraiyar 5%.

Malayalis are around 9%. Rest of the communities make up around 6-10% of the population.

Travancore-cochin assembly

Madras State assembly

Tamil Nadu assembly

Election results

2021

2016

2011

2011

2006

2001

1996

1991

1989

1984

1980

1977

1971

1967

1962

1957

1954

1952

{{Election box new seat win

Notes

References 
 

Assembly constituencies of Tamil Nadu
Kanyakumari district